John Sidney Lockwood (7 December 192025 April 2013) was a British variety entertainer, comedian and actor, who also became notable in Australia after emigrating to that country.  

Lockwood worked in radio, theatre, television and film. He became well known for his role in the Australian television soap opera Number 96 playing bumbling Hungarian Jewish deli proprietor Aldo Godolfus from 1972 until 1975, a central cast member opposite Philippa Baker who would play his future wife Roma and naive rebellious teenage daughter Rose (played by Vivienne Garrett).

The comedy of much of the duo of Aldo and Roma stemmed from both being European immigrants (Aldo from Hungary, And Roma from Russia), who had trouble understanding the local language.

Although Aldo was essentially a comedy character, prior to Number 96, Lockwood had not performed in drama and was primarily a stand-up comic.

Biography

Early career

Lockwood had always wanted to perform on stage. He was orphaned at age 11, and at 14 applied for a job as a dancer in a touring show. He continued to develop his talents and by 18 was given a contract by impresario Jack Hylton as a comedian.  He was a member of the charitable entertainment fraternity, the Grand Order of Water Rats.

His entertainment career was briefly put on hold, as World War II intervened and Lockwood joined the Royal Air Force in 1942 and was honourably discharged in 1944. Lockwood returned to performing, working in vaudeville, pantomime, radio and television. In 1949 he performed in the Royal Command Performance at the London Coliseum. During the performance he tripped and fell, suffering a bloody nose. His quip to the audience was "Well, they told me you wanted blood tonight" was widely reported by the press.

Theatre
A prominent member of theatre, Lockwood came to Australia in 1957 for a ten-week run with the Tivoli Theatre circuit, however after that job finished he remained in Australia for five years. and appeared in a stage production opposite Bobby Limb. He returned to the UK to play Fagin in Lionel Bart's Oliver! at the New Theatre but then he returned permanently to Australia.

Television
Lockwood spent a year with television series Sunnyside Up, went to the US to perform in Las Vegas, and returned to Australia for a two-year run with classic comedy series The Mavis Bramston Show, and then played the lead role in Canterbury Tales. The role in Number 96 followed in 1972. Lockwood was an original cast member of the series; his character was specifically devised by writer David Sale (who also wrote for Bramston), as bumbling delicatessen proprietor Aldo Godolfus. Aldo was originally conceived as a Greek emigrant, but the character was later changed to a Hungarian Jew to suit the actor's dialect; his character soon wed his deli employee Roma Lubinsky (Philippa Baker) and the duo were developed as comedy characters, who became highly recognised figures in the serial. Aldo and Roma were famously and later regretfully killed off in a dramatic revamp of the series – during "the infamous bomb blast storyline" – in September 1975.

During the 1980s and 1990s, Lockwood made guest appearances in Australian drama series and soap operas. In 1985, he appeared in soap opera Neighbours as Daphne Lawrence's grandfather, Harry Henderson. He guest starred in two 1991 episodes of soap opera E Street. During this period he also acted in feature films.

He had a short theatre run in a Queensland production in the early 1980s portraying Tevye in Fiddler on the Roof.

Film
In the early 2000s Lockwood continued to make television and film appearances including roles in Moulin Rouge! and miniseries The Potato Factory.  He also continued stage work with the Sydney Theatre Company.

Personal life
Anne Lockwood, Johnny Lockwood's wife since 1947, died in Sydney in 1976. After Johnny had gone to bed one evening she died after suffering a heart attack and falling from the balcony of their high-rise apartment. Some people speculated that she had committed suicide, something Johnny angrily denied.

Lockwood married again in 1980.  His daughter Joanna Lockwood, born in Australia is an actress, best known for her long-running role in television serial Cop Shop; she also appeared briefly in Number 96.

Lockwood, died on 25 April 2013 at a nursing home in Coffs Harbour, aged 92.

Filmography

Notes

External links

1920 births
2013 deaths
Male actors from London
British emigrants to Australia
English male film actors
English male soap opera actors
English male stage actors
Royal Air Force personnel of World War II